Alençon is a commune in Normandy, France, capital of the Orne department. Alençon belongs to the intercommunality of Alençon (with 52,000 people).

History
The name of Alençon is first recorded in a document dated in the seventh century. During the tenth century, Alençon was a buffer state between Normandy and the Maine regions.

In 1049–1051, William Duke of Normandy, later known as William the Conqueror and king of England, laid siege to the town, which had risen in support of the Count of Anjou along with two other towns of the Bellême estates, Domfront (then in Maine) and Bellême (held directly from King Henry I of France). According to Duke William's chaplain and panegyrist, William of Poitiers, the defenders of the fortress refused to surrender and mockingly waved animal hides from the castle walls, referencing William's lineage as the grandson of a tanner. In response to this, William had 32 prisoners of the town's hands and feet cut off, prompting a sudden surrender. Upon hearing of this event, the town of Domfront also surrendered.

Alençon was occupied by the English during the Anglo-Norman wars of 1113 to 1203.

The city became the seat of a dukedom in 1415, belonging to the sons of the King of France until the French Revolution, and some of them played important roles in French history: see Duke of Alençon. The French Revolution caused relatively little disorder in this area although there were some royalist uprisings nearby.

A long-standing local fabric industry gave birth to the town's famous point d'Alençon lace in the 18th century. The economic development of the nineteenth century was based on iron foundries and mills in the surrounding region. In the first half of the twentieth century the city developed a flourishing printing industry.

Alençon was home to Sts. Louis Martin and Marie-Azélie Guérin, the parents of St. Thérèse of Lisieux. They were the first spouses in the history of the Catholic Church to be proposed for sainthood as a couple, in 2008. Zélie and Louis were married at the Basilica of Notre-Dame in Alençon on 13 July 1858 and spent their whole married life in Alençon, where Thérèse was born in January 1873 and spent her early childhood until the death of her mother in 1877. 

On 17 June 1940 the German Army took occupation of Alençon. On 12 August 1944 Alençon was the first French city to be liberated by the French Army under General Leclerc, after minor bomb damage.

After the war the population sharply increased and new industries settled. Many of these were related to plastics and the town is now a major plastics educational centre.

Climate

Population

Heraldry

Economy
In the seventeenth century, Alençon was chiefly noted for its lace called point d'Alençon.

Today, Alençon is home to a prosperous plastics industry, and, since 1993, to a plastics engineering school.

MPO Fenêtres is a local PVC windows company established in Alençon since 1970, is one of the first company in Alençon with around 170 employees (2009) and a turnover of 28 million euros in 2008. It is also the oldest French PVC windows company still in activity.

Education

Transport
Alençon is linked by the A28 autoroute (motorway/freeway) with the nearby cities of Le Mans to the south (Sarthe) and Rouen (Seine-Maritime) to the north. The A88 autoroute links the A28 just north of Alençon to the coastal port of Caen.

The Alençon railway station offers regional services towards Caen, Le Mans and Tours. A comprehensive town bus system operates from 7:00 to 19:00.

There is a comprehensive network of cycle paths.

Notable people

Anne d'Alençon (1492–1562), marquise of Montferrat
Marie-Catherine de Villedieu (1640–1683), novelist
Pierre Allix (1641–1717), Protestant pastor and author
Jean Castaing (1723–1805), printer, playwright
Léonard Bourdon (1754–1807), revolutionist
Jacques Hébert (1757–1794), editor of the extreme radical newspaper Le Père Duchesne during the French Revolution
Louis de Frotté (1766–1800), Chouan general
Edme Castaing (1796–1824), doctor and murderer
Jacques-Julien Houtou de Labillardière (1755–1834), botanist
Juste Lisch (1828–1910), architect
Raoul Le Mouton de Boisdeffre (1839–1919), general
Éléonore-Aglaé-Marie Despierres (1843–1895), historian
Adolphe Gérard (1844–1900), American restaurateur
Adhémar Leclère (1853–1917), author
Thérèse de Lisieux (1873–1897), Roman Catholic nun and saint, and is one of only 33 Doctors of the Church
Auguste Poulet-Malassis (1825–1878), publisher and friend of Baudelaire
Marie-Azélie Guérin Martin (1831–1877), the mother of St. Thérèse of Lisieux who, along with her husband Louis Martin, is one of the few married couples ever to be beatified by the Catholic Church.
Daniel Balavoine (1952–1986), singer and songwriter
Louis Barillet (1880–1948), glass blower
André Couder (1897–1979), astronomer
Alain Lambert (born 1946), politician
Anne Consigny (born 1963), actress
Yoann (born 1971), graphic artist
Laurence Leboucher (born 1972), cyclist
Lorànt Deutsch (born 1975), actor and writer
Benoît Tréluyer (born 1976), car racer, two-time winner of the Le Mans 24 Hours
Jonathan Cochet (born 1976), car racer
Anthony Geslin (born 1980), cyclist
Orelsan (born 1982), rapper
Arnold Mvuemba (born 1985) footballer

Twin towns – sister cities

Alençon is twinned with:
 Basingstoke and Deane, England, United Kingdom
 Quakenbrück, Germany

Gallery

See also
Alençon lace
Communes of the Orne department

References

External links

Official website
Alençon Tourist Office
Shrine of Alençon: pilgrimage on the steps of St. Therese and her parents, the blessed Louis and Zelie Martin
Website about the life, writings, spirituality, and mission of St. Therese of the Child Jesus of the Holy Face; information about the life of her family in Alençon and about pilgrimages to Alençon

Communes of Orne
Prefectures in France
Orne communes articles needing translation from French Wikipedia